The 2010–11 East Midlands Counties Football League season was the third in the history of East Midlands Counties Football League, a football competition in England.

League

The league featured 19 clubs from the previous season, along with one new club:
Thurnby Nirvana, promoted from the Leicestershire Senior League

Also, Bardon Hill Sports changed name to Bardon Hill, Hinckley Downes changed name to Hinckley, Holbrook Miners Welfare changed name to Holbrook Sports.

League table

References

External links
 East Midlands Counties Football League official site

2010–11
10